Loya may refer to:mal

Phiri, a clan of the Chewa people
Phiri (surname), a surname
Phiri, Soweto, a township in Soweto, Johannesburg, South Africa